See My Friends is a studio album released by Ray Davies with the collaboration of various other artists on 1 November 2010 in Europe and in early 2011 in the US. The album features new studio collaborations of Ray Davies' compositions, which were originally recorded by his band the Kinks.

The album was recorded in Oslo, New York City, New Jersey, Chicago and London. Davies stated: "This project came about almost by accident, with some tracks I had to appreciate the style of the other artists, otherwise it would have sounded unbalanced. And I wanted the album to work as an entire listening experience but each track had a life of its own".

The album includes the last studio recording by Alex Chilton. See My Friends was released seven months after his death. He previously covered "Till The End of The Day" on Big Star's Third/Sister Lovers.

Critical reception
See My Friends was met with "mixed or average" reviews from critics. At Metacritic, which assigns a weighted average rating out of 100 to reviews from mainstream publications, this release received an average score of 51 based on 13 reviews.

Kinks biographer Rob Jovanovic writes that, following the 2009 album The Kinks Choral Collection and other projects in which Davies revisited his past achievements, See My Friends suggested "he couldn't leave it alone". According to Jovanovic, the majority of critics questioned the reason for the album. Among these reviews, Mojo gave it one star out of five, and dismissed Davies and Metallica's version of "You Really Got Me" as a "travesty".

In a review for AllMusic, Stephen Thomas Erlewine wrote: "A tribute album starring the man of honor himself, who also curated the whole affair, See My Friends is a bit of a curious creature. Certainly, Ray Davies' influence is so pervasive he could rope in a number of heavy hitters from a number of different generations." At American Songwriter, Michael Sandlin said "See My Friends proves, if nothing else, that there's simply no force on Earth malevolent enough to destroy a good Ray Davies ditty. CC Baxter of Clash explained: "See My Friends was a labour of love for head Kink Ray Davies, it feels like a personal journey through the past on his part, and a genuine tribute from those who've contributed.

Commercial performance
In the UK, See My Friends peaked at number 12 on the UK Albums Chart, and number 9 in Scotland.

Track listing

Charts

References

2010 albums
Ray Davies albums
Universal Records albums
Vocal duet albums
Albums produced by Ray Davies
The Kinks tribute albums
Collaborative albums